2011 NCAA men's college soccer season may refer to:

 2011 NCAA Division I men's soccer season
 2011 NCAA Division II men's soccer season
 2011 NCAA Division III men's soccer season